Alexander Gillespie Pearson (21 January 1856 – 24 January 1931) was a Scottish first-class cricketer and legal advocate.

The son of Andrew Pearson, he was born at Edinburgh in January 1856. He was educated firstly at the Loretto School in Musselburgh, before transferring to Rugby School. From Rugby, he matriculated ar Balliol College, Oxford in 1875. While studying at Oxford, he played first-class cricket for Oxford University from 1876–78, making sixteen appearances. Pearson scored 163 runs at an average of 8.15, with a high score of 35. With his right-arm roundarm medium pace bowling, he took 16 wickets at a bowling average of 18.06 and best figures of 3 for 10.

After graduating from Oxford, Pearson became a member of the Faculty of Advocates. He was also a justice of the peace for Dumfriesshire. Pearson died in Switzerland at Locarno in January 1931. His brother, Robert, also played first-class cricket.

References

External links

1856 births
1931 deaths
Cricketers from Edinburgh
People educated at Loretto School, Musselburgh
People educated at Rugby School
Alumni of Balliol College, Oxford
Scottish cricketers
Oxford University cricketers
Lawyers from Edinburgh
Members of the Faculty of Advocates
Scottish justices of the peace